Haluatko miljonääriksi? (English translation: Do you want to become a millionaire?) is a Finnish game show based on the British format of Who Wants to Be a Millionaire?. The aim of the game is to win €1,000,000 (from 2001 to 2005 - €200,000 and from 1999 to 2001 1,000,000mk) by answering fifteen multiple-choice questions correctly. The show began broadcasting on Nelonen in 1999, and it moved to MTV3 in 2005, before Nelonen resurrected the show in 2016.

As of 2022, the show is hosted by Antti Holma, with Lasse Lehtinen, Ville Klinga, and Jaajo Linnonmaa having served in the position before him.

The largest win in the series occurred in October 2002 when 18-year-old student Markku Rikola won €70,000 of the then-maximum €200,000.

Gameplay

Fastest Finger First
Before the contestant plays the game, they must beat five other contestants in a minigame known best internationally as "Fastest Finger First". Contestants have to rearrange four answers into the correct order in the fastest time out of the six contestants.

Into the Hot Seat
When playing the main game, contestants must climb up the money tree by answering fifteen multiple-choice general knowledge questions correctly. The money won is not cumulative, for example if a contestant passes the €200 mark, they win €200, not €100 + €200. The contestant can walk away with the money they have at any time. If the contestant answers incorrectly, they return to the last safety net they achieved.

To aid the contestant there are three "lifelines" - Fifty-Fifty (50:50), Phone-a-Friend (Kilauta kaverille) and Ask the Audience (Kysy yleisöltä, earlier Kysy katsomolta). If the contestant answers the fifth question correctly, they will leave with at least €1,000 (10,000 mk from 1999-2001; €2,000 from 2001-2005 and 2005-2007). If they answer the tenth question correctly, they will leave with at least €10,000 (100,000mk, 1999-2001; €20,000 from 2001-2005; €15,000 from 2005-2007).

Seasons

Haluatko miljonääriksi? Payout Structure

References

External links
 
 

Who Wants to Be a Millionaire?
Finnish game shows
1999 Finnish television series debuts
2007 Finnish television series endings
1990s Finnish television series
2000s Finnish television series
2010s Finnish television series
Nelonen original programming
MTV3 original programming
Finnish television series based on British television series
Finnish non-fiction television series

fi:Haluatko miljonääriksi?#Haluatko miljonääriksi? Suomessa